Masvidal is a surname of Catalan origin. Notable people with the surname include:

Paul Masvidal (born 1971), American guitarist, songwriter, and producer
Jorge Masvidal (born 1984), American mixed martial artist

Catalan-language surnames